Glycitein is an O-methylated isoflavone which accounts for 5-10% of the total isoflavones in soy food products. Glycitein is a phytoestrogen with weak estrogenic activity, comparable to that of the other soy isoflavones.

Glycitin (glycitein 7-O-glucoside) can be transformed to glycetein by human intestinal flora.

References 

O-methylated isoflavones